Ahyee Aye Elvis (born 13 December 1983 in Abidjan) is an Ivorian footballer, whose last known club was EGS Gafsa.

Career
He can play in both defence and midfield, and signed for Sogndal on 31 August 2004, after having played for Stella Club d'Adjamé in his homeland. Aye, known for his acceleration, took over the position from Robbie Russell, who now plays for Viborg FF. In January 2013, he signed with newly promoted Vard Haugesund.

Career statistics

External links

Sogndal Fotball – Player profile

1983 births
Living people
Ivorian footballers
Sogndal Fotball players
SK Vard Haugesund players
EGS Gafsa players
Eliteserien players
Norwegian First Division players
Ivorian expatriate footballers
Expatriate footballers in Norway
Ivorian expatriate sportspeople in Norway
Footballers from Abidjan
Association football defenders